"Heart Full of Soul" is a 1965 song by the Yardbirds.

Heart Full of Soul may also refer to:

 Heart Full of Soul (album), a 2006 album by Antony Costa
 Heart Full of Soul, a 2008 album by Krishna Das